Victoria Kwakwa is a Ghanaian economist and served as vice president at the World Bank for East Asia and the Pacific between April 2016 and August 2021. She was country director of the World Bank in Vietnam before her current position.

Early life and education
She obtained her B.A. Degree in Economics and Statistics from the University of Ghana, Legon. She later attended  Queens University in Kingston, Canada for her M.A. and PhD in Economics with a specialization in International Trade and Finance and Monetary Theory.

Career
She started her career as a young economist with the World Bank (WB) in 1989. As President of the East Asia Pacific Region,  Kwakwa was the direct manager of Rodrigo Chaves who was ultimately forced to resign from WB in late 2019 after multiple complaints of sexual harassment and assault.  Internal investigations led to his recall to Washington and demotion.  Chaves was WB Country Director for Indonesia 2013-19 from which multiple complaints arose. Kwakwa did not take action. Chaves later became the Finance Minister for Costa Rica.

References

External links
 Profile at World Bank
 Appointment as Vice President for East Asia and Pacific region

Living people
Ghanaian economists
Ghanaian women economists
Women of African descent
Year of birth missing (living people)